Octavian Bizău  (born 21 November 1997) is a Romanian handballer who plays for CS Dinamo București.

Individual awards 
 Romanian Liga Națională Best Under-21 Player: 2018

References

1997 births
Living people 
Romanian male handball players 
CSA Steaua București (handball) players